Pat or Patrick Maloney may refer to:

Sean Patrick Maloney, U.S. Representative for New York's 18th congressional district
Patrick Maloney (politician), member of the Kansas House of Representatives
Pat Maloney (1888–1979), baseball outfielder
Pat Maloney Sr. (1924–2005), American trial lawyer
Pat Maloney (footballer) (1894–1955), Australian rules footballer